Kanwal Ziai (born Hardayal Singh Datta) (15 March 1927 – 27 October 2011) was an Urdu and Hindi language poet and author from India.

Early life
Ziai was born on 15 March 1927 in Kanjrur Dattan, Sialkot, (now Pakistan). He received award Doon Ratan from Nagrik Parishad. He obtained Urdu Fazil certificate. He retired from Defence Department. He was also president of the Bazm-e-Jigar. He died on 27 October 2011 in Dehradun, Uttarakhand, India.

See also
 List of Indian poets
 List of Urdu language poets
 List of Urdu writers
 List of Urdu language writers

Bibliography
 Pyase Jaam Urdu Poetry in Devnagri (Hindi) Language 1973
 Lafzo Ki Diwar in Urdu Language 1993
 Kagaz ka Dhua
 Dhoop ka Safar

References

External links
 

1927 births
2011 deaths
Urdu-language poets from India
Indian male poets
20th-century Indian poets
Writers from Dehradun
Poets from Uttarakhand
20th-century Indian male writers